Aberthaw Power Station refers to two decommissioned coal-fired and co-fired biomass power stations on the coast of South Wales, near Barry in the Vale of Glamorgan. They were located at Limpert Bay, near the villages of Gileston and West Aberthaw. The most recent power station on the site, Aberthaw B Power Station, co-fired biomass and as of 2008 had a generating capacity of 1,560 megawatts (MW). The power station closed on 31 March 2020.

The station was the location of a carbon capture trial system to determine whether the technology could be scaled up from lab conditions. The system consumed 1 MW.

History
The site of the stations was a golf course before the construction of the first station. Aberthaw was constructed by the Central Electricity Generating Board (CEGB) under the chairmanship of Christopher Hinton. It is known as one of the original 'Hinton Heavies', a suite of new 500 MW units procured at the time. Aberthaw "A" Power Station although recorded as first generating power on 7 February 1960, officially opened on 29 October 1963, and at the time it was the most advanced in the world. Aberthaw "B" station opened in 1971. Aberthaw "A" operated until 1995. It was subsequently demolished. Its two  chimneys were the last section to be demolished, and this was done on Saturday, 25 July 1998.
The site now has three generating units, each driven by its own Foster-Wheeler boiler. From 20062007 new steam turbines were fitted, allowing each unit to generate an extra 28-30 MW of power. Each unit  rated at 520 MW.

Operations
Aberthaw burned approximately 5,0006,000 tonnes of fuel a day. The site usually burned two-thirds Welsh coal with the remainder being either foreign low-sulphur coal or biomass.

The station took its entire coal feed stock in by rail from the Vale of Glamorgan Line, under contract to DBS. Rail facilities included east- and west-facing connections to the main line, three reception sidings, No. 8 and No. 9 merry-go-round loop lines, two gross-weight and tare-weight weighbridges, two hopper wagon discharge hoppers, a former fly ash siding, an oil discharge siding, two sidings adjacent to the former A station, and two exchange sidings.

Aberthaw A 
The A station had six 100 MW turbo-alternators giving a gross output of 600 MW. The boilers operated on pulverised coal and delivered 570 kg/s of steam at 103.4 bar and 524 °C. Station cooling was by sea water. In 1980/1 the station sent out 1,718.786 GWh, the thermal efficiency was 30.23 per cent. Aberthaw A was one of the CEGB's twenty steam power stations with the highest thermal efficiency; in 1963–4 the thermal efficiency was 34.08 per cent, 34.67 per cent in 1964–5, and 34.27 per cent in 1965–6.

The output from the A station was as follows:

Aberthaw B
The B station had 2 × 462 MW and 1 × 475 MW turbo-alternators giving a gross output of 1,399 MW. The boilers operated on pulverised coal and delivered 1,170 kg/s of steam at 158.6 bar and 566 °C. Station cooling was by sea water. In 1978/9 the station sent out 4,083.124 GWh and in 1980/1 sent out 5,620.143 GWh.

There was a gas-turbine generating facility at Aberthaw, this was commissioned in February 1967. There were three 17.5 MW gas turbines with a total rating of 52.5 MW, they delivered 0.392 GWh in the year 1980/1.

Until its closure, the Tower Colliery in Hirwaun supplied much of the coal for Aberthaw. Until 2017 coal came from the Ffos-y-fran Land Reclamation Scheme in Merthyr Tydfil. Other sources included: the Aberpergwm drift and opencast mines in the Neath Valley; and the Cwmgwrach Colliery via the Onllwyn Washery and the Tower Opencast mine based at the site of the original Tower Colliery. Further stocks were sourced from abroad, primarily Russia, and shipped in via the ports of Portbury, Avonmouth and Newport Docks.

In response to the UK government's renewable energy obligation that came into effect in April 2002, the station began firing a range of biomass materials to replace some of the coal burned. This is due to Welsh coal being less volatile than other coal and as such producing more sulphur dioxide and carbon monoxide.

Flue gas desulphurization
Aberthaw B was due for closure, but in June 2005 station owners Npower agreed to install new technology to reduce sulphur dioxide emissions by installing flue-gas desulfurization (FGD) equipment. This was to reduce sulphur dioxide levels by 90% by 2008, when new European environmental regulations came into place. Construction of the equipment started on 21 June 2006, with a tree planting ceremony attended by the Welsh Minister for Enterprise, Innovation and Networks, Andrew Davies. The desulphurisation FGD project was being carried out by a consortium of Alstom and Amec Foster Wheeler, which was to have employed 500 workers on site at the peak of construction.

Nuclear proposal
In 2006, it was reported that consultants for the Department of Trade and Industry had identified the site as a suitable location for a nuclear power station, based on the existing infrastructure and logistics. The department commented "We are conducting an energy review. The review is to see whether there should be a nuclear element to Britain's energy plan, and it would be a bit odd to identify sites for nuclear power stations at this time."

Court case
On 26 March 2015, the BBC reported that the UK government was being taken to court by the European Commission over excess emissions of nitrogen oxides from Aberthaw power station. This issue was raised in the National Assembly for Wales on 10 November 2015 by Bethan Jenkins AM.

Closure
The station's closure was first announced on 1 August 2019. The station officially closed on 31 March 2020, the same date of closure as Fiddlers Ferry Power Station in Widnes, Cheshire.

Re-development
The site of Aberthaw Power Station has been suggested as a site for tidal energy generation with the Cardiff Capital Region confirming its intention to buy the site. It was confirmed on 3 March 2022 that the Capital Region had bought the site from RWE for £8 million.

See also

Aberthaw Cement Works
Aberthaw lime works
List of active coal fired power stations in the United Kingdom
npower UK

References

External links
 
  1995 aerial photograph

Buildings and structures in the Vale of Glamorgan
RWE
Coal-fired power stations in Wales
Demolished power stations in the United Kingdom
St Athan